The 1926 Providence Steam Roller season was their second in the league. The team failed to improve on their previous season's output of 6–5–1, winning only five games. They finished eleventh in the league.

Schedule

Standings

References

Providence Steam Roller seasons
Providence Steam Roller